The Impossibility of Reason is the second studio album by the American heavy metal band Chimaira, released on May 13, 2003. It is the first album to feature Matt DeVries on rhythm guitar. The album is a noted for its groove metal-oriented sound, especially when compared to the band's previous releases which were considered closer to the nu metal genre. Upon release, it debuted No. 117 on the Billboard 200 charts. To date the album has sold around 200,000 copies in the US.

A limited edition version of The Impossibility of Reason was released in 2004, which included a bonus disc called Reasoning the Impossible. The song "Army of Me" appeared on the Freddy vs. Jason soundtrack.

Production
The Impossibility of Reason was recorded with six-string guitars in drop C tuning, a standard that future albums would follow, and deemphasizes electronic effects. Rob Arnold later explained that the higher tuning allows "much more clarity and power to the attack" in comparison to the murky drop A tuning used on Pass Out of Existence. Thus, the album has been considered heavier than Chimaira's 2001 debut, yet still bears a melodic side. Vocalist Mark Hunter noted the album's musical growth and credited the influence of band's they toured with. He also elaborated that while the sampling featured in their previous album was "ear candy," it would be more focused to "enhance the music" on their 2003 effort. Chimaira would continue their progression of heaviness with future albums.

In an interview, Hunter described The Impossibility of Reason and compared it with the band's prior release:
"With the new album we give the listener a feeling like they can’t breathe, the songs pound you continuous. The breakdowns in the songs don’t go all soft, but stay on the heavy level."

The production of The Impossibility of Reason was filmed and would be included on the Dehumanizing Process DVD in October 2004.

Touring and promotion
Chimaira toured with the likes of In Flames, Soilwork and Unearth before joining Ozzfest 2003. They also performed on European Road Rage 2003 with Spineshank and Ill Niño before heading to Japan and Australia, the latter being firsts for Chimaira.

In early 2003, a music video was filmed for the melodic "Down Again" which aired on Uranium. By autumn that same year, a video for "Pure Hatred" debuted and gained substantial airplay on Headbangers Ball. With its intense, anthemic chorus, the song became a concert favorite with significant crowd participation. On November 16, 2004, "Pure Hatred" was also featured in the MythBusters episode "Exploding House" during the "talking to plants" segment.

Track listing

Notes
Tracks 1-2 taken from the pre-production sessions for The Impossibility of Reason (November 2002)
Produced and mixed by Ben Schigel
Co-produced by Mark Hunter and Rob Arnold
Tracks 3-4 are out-takes from the Pass Out of Existence album sessions (April 2001)
Track 4 was recorded as part of a tribute cover album for The Cure
Produced and mixed by Andrew Murdock
Tracks 5-9 taken from various pre-production sessions for Pass Out of Existence (March 2000–February 2001)
Produced and mixed by Ben Schigel
 Tracks 10-11 recorded live off the board at The Glass House, Pomona, CA (December 7, 2003)
 (Un)mixed by Tom Kubik

Personnel
Chimaira
 Mark Hunter – vocals, guitar on "Implements of Destruction"
 Rob Arnold – lead guitar
 Andols Herrick – drums
 Matt DeVries – rhythm guitar
 Chris Spicuzza –  keyboards, electronics
 Jim LaMarca – bass guitar

Additional musicians
Jason Hager – rhythm guitar (Reasoning the Impossible, Tracks 3-9)
Ricky Evensend – live drums (Reasoning the Impossible, Tracks 10-11)

Production
 Ben Schigel – producer, engineer
 Mark Hunter – producer
 Rob Arnold – producer
 Colin Richardson – mixing
 Ted Jensen – mastering at Sterling Sound
 Garrett Zunt – artwork

References

Chimaira albums
2003 albums
Roadrunner Records albums